Michele Scarabelli (born April 11, 1955) is a Canadian actress. She is probably best known for her role as Tenctonese Newcomer Susan Francisco on the Fox Network science fiction series Alien Nation and the five television movies that followed.

Career
Scarabelli's other roles include Charlotte in the 1986 movie Perfect Timing, Agent 3 in the Journeyman Project series of computer games, Jo Santini on season four of Airwolf, and numerous TV movies and guest appearances including the War of the Worlds episode "A Multitude of Idols" and the Star Trek: The Next Generation episode "In Theory" in which she played Lt. Jenna D'Sora, a short-term girlfriend of the android officer Lt. Commander Data. In addition, Scarabelli played Ray Krebbs' unstable lover Connie Hall in six episodes of Dallas in 1988 and made appearances on Philip Marlowe, Private Eye, and Supernatural. She also voiced Six in Nelvana's Seven Little Monsters. Scarabelli guest starred as Martha Kent in the CW television  series Superman & Lois.

She also provided the voice of Michelle Visard in the video games The Journeyman Project: Pegasus Prime, The Journeyman Project 2: Buried in Time and The Journeyman Project 3: Legacy of Time.

Filmography

Film

Television

Video games

References

External links

The Official Michele Scarabelli website

Canadian film actresses
Canadian stage actresses
Canadian television actresses
Canadian voice actresses
Canadian people of Italian descent
McGill University Faculty of Science alumni
Canadian video game actresses
Actresses from Montreal
1955 births
Living people
20th-century Canadian actresses
21st-century Canadian actresses